Philip Doyle may refer to:

 Philip Doyle (American football) (born 1969), American football placekicker
 Philip Doyle (rugby union coach) (born 1964), Irish rugby union coach
 Philip Doyle (rower) (born 1992), Irish rower